Hadriani may refer to:
Hadriani ad Olympum, ancient town and bishopric of Bithynia
Hadriani, historic name of Hadrianopolis (Pisidia)